The women's 400 metres at the 1978 European Athletics Championships was held in Prague, then Czechoslovakia, at Stadion Evžena Rošického on 29, 30, and 31 August 1978.

Medalists

Results

Final
31 August

Semi-finals
30 August

Semi-final 1

Semi-final 2

Heats
29 August

Heat 1

Heat 2

Heat 3

Heat 4

Participation
According to an unofficial count, 25 athletes from 13 countries participated in the event.

 (1)
 (1)
 (2)
 (3)
 (2)
 (2)
 (3)
 (1)
 (1)
 (2)
 (1)
 (3)
 (3)

References

400 metres
400 metres at the European Athletics Championships
1978 in women's athletics